6 Corvi is a single star in the southern constellation of Corvus, located 341 light years away from the Sun. It is visible to the naked eye as a faint, orange-hued star with an apparent visual magnitude of 5.66. This object is moving closer to the Earth with a heliocentric radial velocity of −2.4 km/s. It is an evolved giant star with a stellar classification of K1 III. The star has expanded to 13.6 times the Sun's radius and is radiating 75.5 times the luminosity of the Sun from its enlarged photosphere at an effective temperature of 4,608 K.

References

K-type giants
Corvus (constellation)
Durchmusterung objects
Corvi, 6
107815
060425
4711